The 2019 Pac-12 Conference men's soccer season was the 20th season of men's varsity soccer in the conference. The season began in August 2019 and concluded in November 2019.

Background

Previous season 

The four-time defending champions, Stanford, successfully defended their Pac-12 title. The Cardinal entered the NCAA Tournament as the three-time defending champions, but were eliminated by Akron in the quarterfinals. Joining Stanford in the tournament were Oregon State, Washington, and UCLA.

Coaching changes 
On March 12, 2019, UCLA head coach, Jorge Salcedo was arrested, and indicted by a federal grand jury in Boston for conspiracy to commit racketeering for alleged participation in the 2019 college admissions bribery scandal. His indictment charged Salcedo with taking $200,000 in bribes to help two students, one in 2016 and one in 2018, get admitted to UCLA using falsified soccer credential admission information.

As a result, he was placed on leave by UCLA from his coaching position at the school. On March 21, 2019, it was announced that he had resigned.

During the spring season matches between March 21 and April 29, 2019 assistant coaches Phil Marfuggi and Matt Taylor took over coaching duties on an interim basis. On April 29, 2019, UCLA hired Ryan Jorden as the head coach of the program. Jorden had previously coached University of the Pacific men's soccer team.

Teams

Head coaches 

 AC = Assistant coach

Stadiums and locations 

 Arizona, Arizona State, Colorado, Oregon, USC, Utah, and Washington State sponsor men's soccer at the club level and thus do not compete in the Pac-12 Conference. San Diego State is an associate member.

Regular season 

All times Pacific time.

Conference results 
Each team plays every other conference team twice; once home and once away.

Positions by round

Postseason

NCAA Tournament 

The NCAA Tournament will begin in November 2019 and conclude in December 2019.

Rankings

National rankings

Regional rankings - USC Far West Region 

The United Soccer Coaches' Far West region ranks teams across the Pac-12, Big West, and WAC.

Awards and honors

Player of the week honors
Following each week's games, Pac-12 conference officials select the player of the week.

Postseason honors

National awards

2020 MLS Draft

The 2020 MLS SuperDraft will be held in January 2020.

Homegrown players 

The Homegrown Player Rule is a Major League Soccer program that allows MLS teams to sign local players from their own development academies directly to MLS first team rosters. Before the creation of the rule in 2008, every player entering Major League Soccer had to be assigned through one of the existing MLS player allocation processes, such as the MLS SuperDraft.

To place a player on its homegrown player list, making him eligible to sign as a homegrown player, players must have resided in that club's home territory and participated in the club's youth development system for at least one year. Players can play college soccer and still be eligible to sign a homegrown contract.

References

External links 
 Pac-12 Men's Soccer

 
2019 NCAA Division I men's soccer season